Magdalena Skipper is a British geneticist and the editor-in-chief of the journal Nature. She previously served as an editor of Nature Reviews Genetics and the open access journal Nature Communications.

Education 
Skipper obtained a bachelor's degree in genetics at the University of Nottingham. She completed her PhD in 1998 at the University of Cambridge, where she worked in Jonathan Hodgkin's lab investigating sex-determination systems in the nematode worm Caenorhabditis elegans. She is a member of Corpus Christi College, Cambridge.

Career and research 
After completing her PhD she joined the Medical Research Council (MRC) Laboratory of Molecular Biology (LMB) at the University of Cambridge. She briefly worked as a postdoctoral fellow at the Imperial Cancer Research Fund, working on the notch signaling pathway of zebrafish in gut development.

Skipper joined Nature in 2001 as an associate editor for Nature Reviews Genetics. During her editorship she interviewed several high-profile scientists including Anne McLaren, Mario Capecchi and Oliver Smithies. In 2002 she was appointed chief editor of Nature Reviews Genetics, and was promoted to associate publisher in 2008. She serves on the advisory board of the Centre for Personalised Medicine at the University of Oxford. Skipper worked briefly as Director for Scientific Communications at the Altius Institute for Biomedical Sciences in Seattle.

In 2018 she worked with Nature and Estée Lauder Companies to launch a global award for women in science. She became the first woman editor-in-chief of Nature in its 150-year history in May 2018, when she succeeded Philip Campbell. She has stated that she intends to ensure that science is reproducible and robust, as well as doing more to support early-career researchers.

References

External links

|-

British geneticists
Alumni of the University of Cambridge
Living people
British editors
British women editors
Alumni of the University of Nottingham
British women geneticists
Year of birth missing (living people)
21st-century British journalists
21st-century British biologists
21st-century British women scientists
Nature (journal) editors